Trejsi Sejdini (born May 30, 2000) is an Albanian model, social media influencer and beauty pageant titleholder who was crowned Miss Universe Albania 2018 and represented Albania at the Miss Universe 2018.

Personal life
Sejdini was born in Elbasan, Albania on May 30, 2000 and lives in Tirana. In addition to her native language (Albanian), she speaks 3 foreign languages, namely Italian, French and English. She joined various clips as a model in Albania, and appeared in Gang gang by Fero and Jealousy by Mozzik. Sejdini participated, at the age of 16, in Miss Universe Albania 2016 pageant, but she did not win even though she was one of the favorite competitors. She became the winner in the Miss Universe Albania 2018 pageant in June 2018 at Pallati i Kongreseve. In the same period she became also a social media influencer obtaining success and then she entered in the entertainment world by appearing on various television programs. She represented, at the age of 18, her country (Albania) at the Miss Universe 2018 pageant in December 2018.

Pageantry

Miss Universe Albania 2018
Sejdini was crowned as Miss Universe Albania 2018 pageant on June 6, 2018.

Miss Universe 2018
Sejdini represented Albania at Miss Universe 2018 pageant on December 17, 2018 and she was awarded Miss Photogenic.

References

External links

revistavip.club/miss universe albania
missuniverse.com

Living people
2000 births
Albanian female models
Miss Universe 2018 contestants
Albanian beauty pageant winners
People from Elbasan